FBC Mortgage Stadium, formerly Bounce House, is an American football stadium on the main campus of the University of Central Florida in Orlando, Florida, United States. 

Bounce House may also refer to:

 Inflatable castle, a temporary play structure

See also
 Bouncy house (music)